Jonathan Bird's Blue World is a family-friendly underwater science/adventure television program. The program is hosted by underwater cinematographer Jonathan Bird. This series airs on public television stations in the US.  The program is designed for family viewing, and each segment finds Bird trying to unravel a mystery, witness an animal behavior or explore an underwater environment. The first season consisted of 5 half-hour programs filmed in standard definition, and the subsequent seasons were all shot in high-definition.  The second and third seasons each won four New England Emmy Awards. The fourth season was nominated for a 2013 National Daytime Emmy Award. The pilot episode from season 1 won a CINE Golden Eagle Award.  The program is magazine format with each television episode consisting of 2-3 segments.  These segments appear individually on YouTube and the Blue World website as webisodes. There are currently 6 seasons.

Episodes

Season 1
Episode 1: Blue Shark Adventure, Underwater Cavern, Giants of the Depths
Episode 2: Swimming with Jaws, The Bandana Game, The Shark and the Whale
Episode 3: A Sharkwreck Mystery, Sea Cows, The Shark with the Long Tail
Episode 4: Wilma the Whale, The Prinz Eugen, The Mysterious Hammerhead
Episode 5: Airplane Graveyard, Killer Clams, The Shark and the Lamprey

Season 2
Episode 1: Aquarist for a Day, Mandarinfish, Whale sharks of Holbox
Episode 2: Manta Rays of Yap, Tropical Fish Rescue, Tiger Sharks
Episode 3: Sea Turtles, Mangroves, Wolffish
Episode 4: Cenotes of Mexico, Venomous Fish, Greenland Sharks
Episode 5: Sea Stars, The Real Nemo, Shark Feeding Frenzy
Episode 6: Lobsters, Remoras, Cayman Stingrays
Episode 7: Antarctic Adventure

Season 3
Episode 1: Blue Holes and the Georgia Aquarium
Episode 2: Goliath Groupers, Coral and Camouflage
Episode 3: Sully the Pilot Whale and Cleaning Stations
Episode 4: Sea Lions and Humpback Whales
Episode 5: Jake Learns to Dive and Curaçao Dolphins
Episode 6: Sea Snakes, Symbiosis and Coral Spawning
Episode 7: Yucatan Sinkhole, Shark Biology and Ocean Defenses
Episode 8: Blind Cavefish, Coral Reefs, Bottom-dwelling Sharks
Episode 9: Sailfish, Potato Cod and Diver Ed

Season 4
Episode 1: Manta Ray Feeding Frenzy and Sea Snakes of Bird Island
Episode 2: Bull Sharks and Inner Space at NASA
Episode 3: Hawaiian Monk Seals, Wounded Warriors, and Counting Fish
Episode 4: Artificial Reefs and Free Diving with Karol Meyer
Episode 5: Saving the Sturgeon and Carol Farming in Key Largo
Episode 6: Belugas, Cousteau's Blue Hole, and Hawaiian Spinner Dolphins
Episode 7: Aquarius Reef Base and Skates & Rays
Episode 8: Stargate Blue Hole and Sponges
Episode 9: Whitetip Reef Sharks, The Kelp Forest, and River of Wrecks
Episode 10: Queen Anne's Revenge: Blackbeard's Shipwreck, and Night of the Mantas
Episode 11: Invasive Species and The Deepest Dive

References

External links

2008 American television series debuts
2000s American children's television series
2000s American documentary television series
American children's education television series
PBS Kids shows
Television series about fish
Television series about mammals
Television series about reptiles and amphibians